, often called , was a province of Japan. It was at the extreme western end of Honshū, in the area that is today Yamaguchi Prefecture. Nagato bordered on Iwami and Suō Provinces.

History
Although the ancient capital of the province was Shimonoseki, Hagi was the seat of the Chōshū han (fief or domain) during the Edo period. Nagato was ruled by the Mōri clan before and after the Battle of Sekigahara.

In 1871 with the abolition of feudal domains and the establishment of prefectures (Haihan Chiken) after the Meiji Restoration, the provinces of Nagato and Suō were combined to eventually establish Yamaguchi Prefecture.  At the same time, the province continued to exist for some purposes.  For example, Nagato is explicitly recognized in treaties in 1894 (a) between Japan and the United States and (b) between Japan and the United Kingdom.

Historically, the oligarchy that came into power after the Meiji Restoration of 1868 had a strong representation from the Chōshū province, as Itō Hirobumi, Yamagata Aritomo, and Kido Kōin were from there.  Other natives famous for their role in the restoration include Yoshida Shōin, Takasugi Shinsaku, and Kusaka Genzui among others.

The Japanese battleship Nagato was named after this province.

Shrines and temples

Sumiyoshi jinja was the chief Shinto shrine (ichinomiya) of Nagato.

Historical districts
 Yamaguchi Prefecture
 Abu District (阿武郡) - absorbed Mishima District on April 1, 1896
 Asa District (厚狭郡) - dissolved
 Mine District (美祢郡) - dissolved
 Mishima District (見島郡) - merged into Abu District on April 1, 1896
 Ōtsu District (大津郡) - dissolved
 Toyoura District (豊浦郡) - dissolved

Maps

See also
 List of Historic Sites of Japan (Yamaguchi)
 Chōshū Five
 Nagato City

Notes

References
 Nussbaum, Louis-Frédéric and Käthe Roth. (2005).  Japan encyclopedia. Cambridge: Harvard University Press. ;  OCLC 58053128
 Papinot, Edmond. (1910). Historical and Geographic Dictionary of Japan. Tokyo: Librarie Sansaisha. OCLC 77691250

External links 

 "Nagato Province" at JapaneseCastleExplorer.com
  Murdoch's map of provinces, 1903

Former provinces of Japan